is a Japanese playwright, director, actor, and filmmaker.

Career
Born in Niihama, Ehime, Kōkami was attending Waseda University when he founded the theatrical company Daisanbutai (Third Stage). Becoming "one of the prime movers in the 1980s small-scale youth theater movement in Japan", he won the Kunio Kishida Award in 1995 for his play Sunafukin no tegami. Earning a fellowship from the Agency for Cultural Affairs in 1997, he spent a year in London, and has since presented such plays as Trance on the London stage. The play Halcyon Days, which he wrote about suicide websites in Japan, has also been presented in Great Britain. In 2010 he won the 61st Yomiuri Prize for Drama.

Kōkami has also directed and acted in several films including Renai Gikyoku: Watashi to koi ni ochitekudasai.

Cool Japan
Cool Japan is a program regularly airing on NHK World-Japan., which attempts to explores the charm and secrets of cool Japanese culture by making full use of the sensibilities of foreigners who live and work in Japan.

Each episode is usually co-hosted by Shôji Kôkami and Risa Stegmayer and consists of 8 foreign panelists and a Japanese commentator who is an expert in the episode's subject. Although some "special" episodes have had large groups (30+) of returning guests.

The program is unique in that it features Japanese and English language and subtitles, as the foreign guests always speak in English, regardless of their native language or fluency in Japanese.

Marty Friedman, the guitarist for Megadeth, has also appeared as the expert (for music) commentator several times, as he has been a resident of Shinjuku for many years

References

External links
Third Stage official website

 
 

Japanese theatre directors
Japanese dramatists and playwrights
Japanese film directors
People from Ehime Prefecture
1958 births
Living people
Actors from Ehime Prefecture
Yomiuri Prize winners